49 Aquarii, abbreviated 49 Aqr, is a star in the zodiac constellation of Aquarius. 49 Aquarii is its Flamsteed designation. It is a dim star with an apparent visual magnitude of 5.53. It is moving closer to the Earth with a heliocentric radial velocity of −13 km/s.

It shows a spectral anomaly with the absorption lines of cyanogen (CN). This is a red clump giant, indicating that it is generating energy through the helium fusion at its core. It is around 950 million years old with 2.2 times the mass of the Sun and has expanded to nine times the Sun's radius. It is radiating 50 times the Sun's luminosity from its enlarged photosphere at an effective temperature of 4,954 K.

References

K-type giants
Horizontal-branch stars
Aquarius (constellation)
Durchmusterung objects
Aquarii, 049
191105
110529
8529